John H. Fraine (1861 – May 15, 1943) was a North Dakota Republican Party politician who served as the tenth Lieutenant Governor of North Dakota under Governor L. B. Hanna. Fraine also served in the North Dakota House from 1909 to 1914.

Notes

Lieutenant Governors of North Dakota
1861 births
1943 deaths
Members of the North Dakota House of Representatives
Speakers of the North Dakota House of Representatives
20th-century American politicians